Ten is a Spanish free-to-air television channel run by Central Broadcaster Media, belongs to Grupo Secuoya.

History 
In October 2015, Grupo Secuoya was announced as one of the winning companies of a digital terrestrial television license. Subsequently, the group announced that the television channel would have a general family programming.

On December 24, 2015 the test signals of the channel began, which was called "10". On February 18, 2016, the official name of the channel was announced: "Ten". In addition to the start of emissions for April 21, 2016.

Between April 2016 and April 2018, the channel maintained its own programming, to be later withdrawn, as of that month, it only broadcast five programs, in addition to home shopping spaces and tarot programs, this as a result of the poor economic results derived from a low audience.

On October 30, 2018, an agreement between Grupo Secuoya and Mediapro for the management of the channel's programming was announced and thus seek an improvement in viewers' rates.

In February 2020, the channel suffered an audience crisis due to the change in broadcast frequencies, losing half of its daily viewers. At the end of 2020, the channel began another process of remodeling its programming when it decided to bet on American television series as Monk or House, and Hispanic talk shows like Caso Cerrado, in addition to eliminating the tarot and home shopping spaces.

Programming 
Ten's programming is based on entertainment. Especially reality shows and docudramas are broadcast. In addition to some television series as Law & Order: UK, Law & Order: Criminal Intent and In Ice Cold Blood.

References

External links
 

Television stations in Spain
Television channels and stations established in 2016
Spanish-language television stations